Nepal Shivsena is a Hindutva political party in Nepal. The party was founded in 1999. It is connected to the Shiv Sena in India. Raj Kumar Rauniyar is the current president of the party.

When the Taliban began destroying the Buddhistic ancient artifacts, the Nepal Shiv Sena strongly criticized the attacks.

References

Nepalese Hindu political parties
Hindu nationalism in Nepal
Shiv Sena
Political parties established in 1999
1999 establishments in Nepal